OIU or Oiu may refer to:

 Oiu, Estonia, a village
 Okan International University, Dania Beach, Florida, United States
 Omdurman Islamic University, Omdurman, Sudan
 Osaka International University, Osaka, Japan
 Okpofe Improvement Union, an association in Okpofe, Nigeria